Siempre te amaré (English: I will always love you) is a Mexican telenovela produced by Juan Osorio for Televisa that premiered on Canal de Las Estrellas on January 24, 2000 and ended on July 28, 2000. It was adapted from the 1975 telenovela Lo imperdonable (The Unforgivable) by Consuelo Garrido and Georgina Tinoco.

Laura Flores, Fernando Carrillo and Arturo Peniche (replacement of Carrillo) starred as protagonists, while Alejandra Ávalos starred as main antagonist.

Cast
 
 Laura Flores as Victoria Robles de Castellanos/Amparo Rivas
 Fernando Carrillo as Mauricio Castellanos Grajales
 Arturo Peniche as Luis Miguel Garay 
 Alejandra Ávalos as Gilda Gómez de Castellanos/Martha Laura Izaguirre
 Gerardo Murguía as Román Castillo Arteaga
 Guillermo García Cantú as Jorge Montesinos
 Alejandro Tommasi as Octavio Elizondo
 Ofelia Guilmáin as Doña Úrsula Grajales Vda. de Castellanos
 María Victoria as Columba Enriqueta Pardo de Serrano
 Gabriela Goldsmith as Ariadna de Granados/Ariadna de Mendizábal
 Rodrigo Vidal as Eduardo Castellanos Robles
 Rafael Rojas as Patricio Mistral
 Renée Varsi as Antonia Castellanos Robles de Reyes
 Vanessa Guzmán as Sabina Castellanos Grajales
 Mónica Dossetti as Rossana Banderas
 Mayrín Villanueva as Berenice Gutiérrez
 Claudia Silva as Lucía
 Alfonso Iturralde as Father Pablo
 Abraham Ramos as Leonardo Reyes Pastor
 Luis Xavier as Francisco Reyes
 Alejandra Procuna as Olivia Salas Berriozábal
 Luz Elena González as Mara
 José Roberto as Abelardo Roldán
 Rosángela Balbó as Constanza de la Parra
 Amparo Garrido as Soledad de Estrada
 Gabriel Varela as Martín Mendizábal
 Oscar Uriel as Tizoc Pardo
 Benjamín Rivero as Virgilio Jobito "El Verrugas"
 Arturo Vázquez as Alberto Estrada
 Miguel Herrer as El Piojo
 Manuel "El Loco" Valdés as Francisco "Pancho" Sánchez
 Frances Ondiviela as Violeta Arizmendi de Garay
 Chao as Julio Granados
 Wendy González as Jazmín Elizondo Silva
 Evita Muñoz "Chachita" as Estrella "Estrellita" Vda. de Silva
 Luis Fernando Torres as Luisito
 Germán Gutiérrez as Fausto Berriozábal
 Ricardo Alejandro Valdés as José "Pepe" Sánchez
 Roberto Marín as Palillo
 Benito Castro as Dr.Jonás Pérez
 Diana Osorio as Mariana Garay Arismendi
 Luis Roberto Guzmán as Alfredo Dominguez
 Adriana Riveramelo as Nayeli de la Parra
 Eugenio Lobo as Adán
 Marco Mũnoz as Hernan
 Ivonne Montero as Mercedes "Meche" González
 Nancy Pablos as Lorenza
 Miguel Priego as Detective Olmos
 Ivonne Bardett as Bonnie
 Alfredo Vega as Cirilo
 Leslie Giovanna as Blanquita
 José Eduardo as Eduardo Castellanos (child)
 Eduardo Rodríguez as Raúl Acosta
 Ernesto Valenzuela as Antonio "Toño" Quintana
 Ana Hally as Rita
 Natasha Dupeyrón as Antonia Castellanos (child)
 Carlos Cámara as Lic. Sandoval
 Kenia Hurtado as Veronica Landeros (child)

References

External links

2000 telenovelas
Mexican telenovelas
2000 Mexican television series debuts
2000 Mexican television series endings
Spanish-language telenovelas
Television shows set in Mexico
Televisa telenovelas